Gomphia is a genus of plant in the family Ochnaceae. The generic name is from the Greek meaning "thorn or spike", referring to the shape of the flower base when the fruit develops.

Description
Gomphia species grow as shrubs or small to medium-sized trees. The fruits are drupes (pitted).

Distribution and habitat
Gomphia species grow widely in the tropics, mainly in Africa but also in India, Sri Lanka, mainland Southeast Asia, Hainan and western Malesia. Their habitat is forests from sea-level to  altitude.

Species
 The Plant List recognises 29 accepted taxa (of species and infraspecific names):

 Gomphia amplectens  
 Gomphia anceps  
 Gomphia angulata  
 Gomphia barberi  
 Gomphia congesta  
 Gomphia deltoidea  
 Gomphia densiflora  
 Gomphia dependens  
 Gomphia duparquetiana  
 Gomphia elongata  
 Gomphia flava  
 Gomphia glaberrima  
 Gomphia laevigata  
 Gomphia likimiensis  
 Gomphia lunzuensis  
 Gomphia lutambensis  
 Gomphia mannii  
 Gomphia mildbraedii  
 Gomphia obtusifolia  
 Gomphia perseifolia  
 Gomphia reticulata  
 Gomphia sacleuxii  
 Gomphia scheffleri  
 subsp. schusteri  
 Gomphia schoenleiniana  
 Gomphia serrata  
 Gomphia squamosa  
 Gomphia subcordata  
 Gomphia vogelii

References

Ochnaceae
Taxonomy articles created by Polbot
Malpighiales genera